Mikhail Aleksandrovich Chekhov (29 August 1891 – 30 September 1955), known as Michael Chekhov, was an American actor, director, author, and theatre practitioner. He was a nephew of the playwright Anton Chekhov and a student of Konstantin Stanislavski. Stanislavski referred to him as his most brilliant student.

Although mainly a stage actor, he made a few notable appearances on film, perhaps most memorably as the Freudian analyst in Alfred Hitchcock's Spellbound (1945), for which he received his only Academy Award nomination.

Life

He was born in Saint Petersburg, the son of Alexander Chekhov (the elder brother of Anton Chekhov) and his wife Natalya Aleksandrovna Golden. It was his father's second marriage. His mother, a Russian Jew, had been the governess to the children from his father's first marriage. He was raised in a middle-class family; his father was in the Imperial Customs Service and was a moderately successful writer.

Chekhov's first wife was actress Olga Chekhova, whom he met at the Moscow Art Theatre First Studio. Olga Chekhova was a daughter of Konstantin Knipper and was the niece of Olga Knipper, Anton Chekhov's wife, after whom she was named. Their daughter, also baptized Olga, was born in 1916 and became a German actress under the name Ada Tschechowa. His second wife was Xenia Karlovna Ziller, of German origins. 

Chekhov studied under the Russian theatre practitioner Konstantin Stanislavski at the First Studio, where he acted, directed, and studied Stanislavski's 'system'. He was also influenced in his creative development as an actor by Yevgeny Vakhtangov and Leopold Sulerzhitsky. 
In 1922, after the death of Vakhtangov, Chekhov became director of the First Studio, which was subsequently renamed Moscow Art Theatre II.

Stanislavski considered Chekhov to be one of his brightest students. When Chekhov experimented with affective memory and had a nervous breakdown, this aided Stanislavski in seeing the limitations of his early concepts of emotional memory.

After the October Revolution, Chekhov split with Stanislavski and toured with his own company. He thought that Stanislavski's techniques led too readily to a naturalistic style of performance. He demonstrated his own theories acting in parts such as Senator Ableukhov in the stage version of Andrei Bely's Petersburg.

With the beginning of Stalinism in 1927, Chekov came into conflict with the Communist regime and was threatened to be arrested, especially for his spiritualist interests. In the late 1920s, Chekhov emigrated to Germany and set up his own studio, teaching a physical and imagination-based system of actor training. He developed the use of the "Psychological Gesture", a concept derived from the Symbolist theories of Bely. In this technique, the actor physicalizes a character's need or internal dynamic in the form of an external gesture. Subsequently, the outward gesture is suppressed and incorporated internally, allowing the physical memory to inform the performance on an unconscious level.

Between 1930 and 1935 he worked in Kaunas State Drama Theatre in Lithuania. Between 1936 and 1939 Chekhov established The Chekhov Theatre School at Dartington Hall, in Devon, England. Following developments in Germany that threatened the outbreak of war he moved to the US with the couple, and later writers, Anne Cumming and Henry Lyon Young to recreate a drama school.

Career

Following Stanislavski's approach, much of what Chekhov explored addressed the question of how to access the unconscious creative self through indirect non-analytical means. Chekhov taught a range of movement dynamics such as molding, floating, flying, and radiating that actors use to find the physical core of a character. 

Despite his seemingly external approach, Chekhov's techniques were meant to lead the actor to a rich internal life. In spite of his brilliance as an actor and his first-hand experience in the development of Stanislavski's groundbreaking work, Chekhov as a teacher was overshadowed by his American counterparts in the 1940s and 1950s and their interpretations of Stanislavski's 'system,' which became known as Method acting. Interest in Chekhov's work has grown, however, with a new generation of teachers. Chekhov's own students included Marilyn Monroe, Anthony Quinn, Clint Eastwood, Dorothy Dandridge, Mala Powers, Yul Brynner, Patricia Neal, Sterling Hayden, Jack Palance, Elia Kazan, Robert Lewis, Paula Strasberg, Guy Gillette, and Lloyd and Dorothy Bridges. In the television programme Inside the Actors Studio, noted actors such as Johnny Depp and Anthony Hopkins have cited Chekhov's book as highly influential on their acting.  Beatrice Straight also thanked Chekhov in her acceptance speech after winning her Oscar for her performance in Network (1976).

Chekhov's description of his acting technique, On the Technique of Acting, was written in 1942. When reissued in 1991 it had additional material by Chekhov estate executor Mala Powers; an abridged version appeared under the title To the Actor in 1953, with a preface by Yul Brynner, and reissued in 2002 with an additional foreword by Simon Callow and additional Russian material translated and commented on by Andrei Malaev-Babel, a notable Russian-born acting scholar and teacher. The English translation of his autobiography The Path of the Actor was edited by Andrei Kirillov and Bella Merlin and published by Routledge in 2005, marking the 50th anniversary of his death. Some of Chekhov's lectures are available on CD under the title On Theatre and the Art of Acting. The documentary From Russia to Hollywood: the 100 Year Odyssey of Chekhov and Shdanoff, profiles Chekhov and his fellow Russian associate George Shdanoff; released in 1998, it is narrated by Mala Powers and Gregory Peck, who starred in Alfred Hitchcock's Spellbound, for which Chekhov earned an Oscar nomination.

Selected filmography

Bibliography
 Чехов, Михаил. Литературное наследие: В 2 т. / Общ. науч. ред. М.О. Кнебель; сост.: И.И. Аброскина, М.С. Иванова, Н.А. Крымова; коммент. И.И. Аброскиной, М.С. Ивановой. М., 1995.

References

Further reading
 Farber, Vreneli, Stanislavsky in Practice: Actor Training in Post-Soviet Russia (Artists & Issues in the Theatre, Vol. 16) New York: Peter Lang, 2008. (summary of M. Chekhov's system and its application in post-Soviet actor training) 
 Евгений Вахтангов. Документы и свидетельства: В 2 т.  / Ред.-сост В.В. Иванов; ред. М.В. Львова, М.В. Хализева.  М.: Индрик, 2011. Т. 1 – 519 с., илл.; Т. 2 – 686 с., илл.
 Евгений Вахтангов в театральной критике / Ред.-сост. В.В. Иванов. М.: Театралис, 2016. – 703 с.; илл.
 Иванов В.В. Евгений Вахтангов и Михаил Чехов. Игра на краю, или Театральный опыт трансцендентального// Русский авангард 1910-1920-х годов и проблема экспрессионизма/ Редколлегия: Г.Ф. Коваленко и др. М.; Наука, 2003.  
 Лекции Рудольфа Штайнера о драматическом искусстве в изложении Михаила Чехова. Письма к В.А. Громову. Публ. С.В. Казачкова и Т.Л. Стрижак. Вступ. текст В.В. Иванова. Коммент. С.В. Казачкова, Т.Л. Стрижак и В.Г. Астаховой // Мнемозина. Документы и факты из истории отечественного театра ХХ века / Ред.-сост. В.В. Иванов. Вып. 2. М.: УРСС, 2000. С. 85–142. 
 "Зритель – лицо всегда загадочное для артиста…" Письма зрителей, читателей и коллег Михаилу Чехову. Публ., вступит. статья и коммент. М.В. Хализевой // Мнемозина. Документы и факты из истории отечественного театра XX века / Ред.-сост. В.В. Иванов. Вып. 4.  М.: Индрик, 2009. С. 585–616.

External links
  Studio Azot méthodes M.Chekhov et Meisner - Paris

 National Michael Chekhov Association
 Michael Chekhov in Russia
 Michael Chekhov International Center
 Michael Chekhov and The Psychological Gesture
 The Actor is the Theatre: a collection of Michael Chekhov's unpublished notes and manuscripts on the art of acting and the theatre: typescript, 1977, held by the Billy Rose Theatre Division, New York Public Library for the Performing Arts
 Michael Chekhov School: A Theatre Laboratory
 The Michael Chekhov Association
 Chekhov International Theatre School in Melikhovo (Russia)
 Chekhov Studio International USA & Europe
 Learn Michael Chekhov's Method at Studio Azot

1891 births
1955 deaths
Theatre directors from Saint Petersburg
People from Sankt-Peterburgsky Uyezd
Russian people of Jewish descent
Acting theorists
American male film actors
American male silent film actors
Drama teachers
Moscow Art Theatre
Russian male film actors
Russian male silent film actors
Russian male stage actors
Russian theatre directors
Theatre practitioners
20th-century American male actors
Emigrants from the Russian Empire to Germany
Emigrants from the Russian Empire to the United States
American people of Russian-Jewish descent
Burials at Forest Lawn Memorial Park (Hollywood Hills)